Tom Allen (born 21 October 1949), known professionally as T.R. Dallas, is a country and Irish singer and former Fianna Fáil member of Westmeath County Council.

Born in Mount Temple, County Westmeath, Tom Allen is the brother of Tony Allen of the folk duo Foster and Allen. Tom worked in motor maintenance and sales, and started his showband singing career in 1970 with the Finnavons Showband, previously fronted by Gerry Black. A few years later he joined the Sailors Showband, and got his break in 1978 replacing John Glenn in The Mainliners, the backing band for Big Tom. In June 1980, Allen exploited the hype around the Dallas soap opera's "Who shot J.R.?" summer cliffhanger by adopting the name "T.R. Dallas" to release the novelty record "Who Shot J.R. Ewing?" which reached number 10 in the Irish Singles Chart. Later that year his cover version of Mac Davis' "It's Hard to Be Humble" reached number 6 in the Irish charts. He continued to tour Ireland and the UK in the 1980s and 1990s, releasing further singles and an album. His career was interrupted in 1990 after he was diagnosed with diabetes.

As Tom Allen he was a Fianna Fáil member of Westmeath Council for the local electoral area of Athlone from the 1999 local elections until defeated in the 2014 election. He continued to perform as T.R. Dallas, often at charity fundraising events.

Discography

References

External links
 Official site

Living people
Irish country singers
Irish male singers
Local councillors in County Westmeath
People from County Westmeath
1949 births